Whiteriver Unified School District is a school district in Navajo County, Arizona, United States.

The district serves parts of Navajo County, including the communities of Cibecue, East Fork, and Whiteriver.

Service area
Young Elementary School District included sections of the Fort Apache Indian Reservation. In 1984 the Young district contracted with Whiteriver USD to educate the Fort Apache students, numbering about 200, due to roads being inaccessible between Fort Apache and Young.  these parts of the reservation are now directly in Whiteriver USD.

Schools
High schools
Alchesay High School and the Career and Technical Education Bldg.

Middle schools
Canyon Day Junior High School
Theodore Roosevelt School*

Elementary schools
Cradleboard Elementary School is a kindergarten through Sixth Grade Elementary School located in the Cradleboard neighborhood of Whiteriver. Cradleboard is on the White Mountain Apache Reservation in the White Mountains of Arizona.
Mary V. Riley Seven Mile Elementary School is the PreK-5 Elementary School. This school feeds in the southern areas of Whiteriver including Canyon Day, 7 Mile, East Fork, and Fort Apache.  
Whiteriver Elementary School is a kindergarten through Fifth grade.

References

External links
Whiteriver Unified School District
Cradleboard Elementary School Webpage

School districts in Navajo County, Arizona
School districts in Gila County, Arizona